Ko Wai is a small island in Ko Chang Archipelago, Trat Province, eastern Thailand. 

The island has nice views over the other islands in the vicinity.

Geography
Ko Wai Island has an irregular shape and is 3 km long and 1 km wide at the widest point. 
The east part of the island is encircled by coral reef and has sand beaches while the west part is more rugged and hilly, and serves as a nesting ground for birds. The interior is covered by forest jungle. There are four bungalow operations on the island and daily boat connections to Ko Chang, Ko Mak, and the mainland, during the season.

Ecology 
The island is a protected area and it is part of Mu Ko Chang National Park.

See also 
 List of islands of Thailand

References

External links 
 Detailed report on Ko Wai at Tezza's Beaches and Islands
 Koh Wai Island Guide Getting there, what to see and do on Koh Wai

Ko Wai